Splendrillia powelli is a species of sea snail, a marine gastropod mollusk in the family Drilliidae.

This species is a junior homonym of † Splendrillia powelli (L. C. King, 1934) -a replacement name will be published.

Description

Distribution
This marine species is endemic to Australia and occurs off Queensland.

References

 Wells, Fred E. "Revision of the Recent Australian Turridae referred to the genera Splendrillia and Austrodrillia." Journal of the Malacological Society of Australia 11.1 (1990): 73–117.

External links
  Tucker, J.K. 2004 Catalog of recent and fossil turrids (Mollusca: Gastropoda). Zootaxa 682:1–1295.
 

powelli
Gastropods of Australia
Gastropods described in 1990